Roman Pavlovich Zakharov (Russian: Роман Павлович Захаров; 11 July 1929 – 14 January 2021) was a Russian rower who represented the Soviet Union. He competed at the 1952 Summer Olympics in Helsinki with the men's coxless four where they were eliminated in the semi-final repêchage.

References

1929 births
2021 deaths
Soviet male rowers
Olympic rowers of the Soviet Union
Rowers at the 1952 Summer Olympics
Rowers from Saint Petersburg